Flandreau Creek is a  river in Minnesota and South Dakota.

The creek was named for Charles Eugene Flandrau, an Indian fighter.

See also
List of rivers of Minnesota
List of rivers of South Dakota

References

USGS Hydrologic Unit Map - State of Minnesota (1974)

Rivers of Lincoln County, Minnesota
Rivers of Pipestone County, Minnesota
Rivers of Moody County, South Dakota
Rivers of Minnesota
Rivers of South Dakota